Pratt County (standard abbreviation: PR) is a county located in the U.S. state of Kansas. As of the 2020 census, the county population was 9,157. The largest city and county seat is Pratt.

History

Early history

For many millennia, the Great Plains of North America was inhabited by nomadic Native Americans.  From the 16th century to 18th century, the Kingdom of France claimed ownership of large parts of North America.  In 1762, after the French and Indian War, France secretly ceded New France to Spain, per the Treaty of Fontainebleau.

19th century
In 1802, Spain returned most of the land to France, but keeping title to about 7,500 square miles.  In 1803, most of the land for modern day Kansas was acquired by the United States from France as part of the 828,000 square mile Louisiana Purchase for 2.83 cents per acre.

In 1854, the Kansas Territory was organized, then in 1861 Kansas became the 34th U.S. state.  In 1867, Pratt County was established.

In 1887, the Chicago, Kansas and Nebraska Railway extended its main line from Herington to Pratt.  This main line connected Herington, Ramona, Tampa, Durham, Waldeck, Canton, Galva, McPherson, Groveland, Inman, Medora, Hutchinson, Whiteside, Partridge, Arlington,  Langdon, Turon, Preston, Natrona, Pratt.  In 1888, this main line was extended to Liberal.  Later, this line was extended to Tucumcari, New Mexico and El Paso, Texas.  This line is called the "Golden State Limited".

Geography

Adjacent counties
 Stafford County (north)
 Reno County (northeast)
 Kingman County (east)
 Barber County (south)
 Kiowa County (west)
 Edwards County (northwest)

Demographics

As of the census of 2000, there were 9,647 people, 3,963 households, and 2,639 families residing in the county.  The population density was 13 people per square mile (5/km2).  There were 4,633 housing units at an average density of 6 per square mile (2/km2).  The racial makeup of the county was 95.28% White, 0.98% Black or African American, 0.35% Native American, 0.55% Asian, 0.03% Pacific Islander, 1.73% from other races, and 1.07% from two or more races.  3.09% of the population were Hispanic or Latino of any race.

There were 3,963 households, out of which 30.00% had children under the age of 18 living with them, 56.70% were married couples living together, 7.50% had a female householder with no husband present, and 33.40% were non-families. 30.40% of all households were made up of individuals, and 14.60% had someone living alone who was 65 years of age or older.  The average household size was 2.35 and the average family size was 2.93.

In the county, the population was spread out, with 24.50% under the age of 18, 9.40% from 18 to 24, 24.00% from 25 to 44, 22.80% from 45 to 64, and 19.20% who were 65 years of age or older.  The median age was 40 years. For every 100 females there were 94.00 males.  For every 100 females age 18 and over, there were 91.30 males.

The median income for a household in the county was $35,529, and the median income for a family was $43,156. Males had a median income of $31,138 versus $20,679 for females. The per capita income for the county was $17,906.  About 6.70% of families and 9.40% of the population were below the poverty line, including 11.50% of those under age 18 and 8.90% of those age 65 or over.

Government

Presidential elections

Laws
Following amendment to the Kansas Constitution in 1986, Pratt County remained a prohibition, or "dry", county until 2000, when voters approved the sale of alcoholic liquor by the individual drink with a 30 percent food sales requirement.

Education

Colleges
 Pratt Community College

Unified school districts
 Pratt USD 382
 Skyline USD 438

Communities

Cities
 Byers
 Coats
 Cullison
 Iuka
 Pratt
 Preston
 Sawyer

Unincorporated communities
 Cairo
 Croft
 Hopewell
 Natrona

Townships
Pratt County is divided into seven townships.  The city of Pratt is considered governmentally independent and is excluded from the census figures for the townships.  In the following table, the population center is the largest city (or cities) included in that township's population total, if it is of a significant size.

See also

References

Notes

Further reading

 Standard Atlas of Pratt County, Kansas; Geo. A. Ogle & Co; 67 pages; 1922.
 Standard Atlas of Pratt County, Kansas; Geo. A. Ogle & Co; 54 pages; 1906.

External links

County
 
 Pratt County - Directory of Public Officials
Maps
 Pratt County Maps: Current, Historic, KDOT
 Kansas Highway Maps: Current, Historic, KDOT
 Kansas Railroad Maps: Current, 1996, 1915, KDOT and Kansas Historical Society

 
Kansas counties
1867 establishments in Kansas
Populated places established in 1867